TENA may refer to:

 TENA, a brand of incontinence products for adults and teenagers
 Test and Training Enabling Architecture (TENA), United States Department of Defense software architecture

See also
 Tena (disambiguation)